The following is a list of churches in South Cambridgeshire.

Active churches 
The district has an estimated 147 active churches for 156,500 inhabitants, a ratio of one church to every 1,065 people.

The only civil parish without a church is Papworth St Agnes.

Defunct churches

Map of medieval parish churches

Cambridgeshire

Central Cambridge

See also 
 List of churches in Cambridgeshire

References 

South Cambridgeshire
 
Churches